Kilian Pagliuca (born 2 September 1996) is a Swiss footballer who plays as a forward for Chemnitzer FC.

References

External links
 
 Profile at DFB.de
 Profile at kicker.de
 
 

1996 births
Living people
Sportspeople from the canton of Geneva
Swiss men's footballers
Switzerland youth international footballers
Swiss expatriate footballers
Association football forwards
FC Meyrin players
Servette FC players
Olympique Lyonnais players
FC Zürich players
FC Wohlen players
Hallescher FC players
FC Carl Zeiss Jena players
FC Nitra players
Chemnitzer FC players
Swiss Challenge League players
Swiss Promotion League players
Championnat National 2 players
3. Liga players
Slovak Super Liga players
Expatriate footballers in France
Swiss expatriate sportspeople in France
Expatriate footballers in Germany
Swiss expatriate sportspeople in Germany
Expatriate footballers in Slovakia
Swiss expatriate sportspeople in Slovakia